Polona is a feminine given name.

Notable people with this name 
 Polona Barič (born 1992), Slovenian handballer
 Polona Batagelj (born 1989), Slovenian road bicycle racer
 Polona Dornik (born 1962), Yugoslav basketball player
 Polona Frelih (born 1970), Slovenian table tennis player
 Polona Juh (born 1971), Slovenian actress
 Polona Hercog (born 1991), Slovenian tennis player
 Polona Klemenčič (born 1997), Slovenian biathlete
 Polona Reberšak (born 1987), Slovenian tennis player
 Polona Zupan (born 1976), Slovenian snowboarder

See also 
 

Given names
Feminine given names
Slavic feminine given names